Patoka Township is one of nine townships in Pike County, Indiana, United States. As of the 2010 census, its population was 3,062 and it contained 1,358 housing units.

History
Patoka Township was organized in 1838.

Geography
The Patoka River flows through the township from east to west.

Cities, towns, villages
 Winslow

Unincorporated towns
 Arthur at 
 Ayrshire at 
 Campbelltown at 
 Glezen at 
 Littles at 
 Marysville at 
 Muren at 
(This list is based on USGS data and may include former settlements.)

Cemeteries
The township contains these eight cemeteries: Crow, Hedges, Martin, Oak Hill, Sugar Ridge, Sunset, Williams and Wyatt.

Major highways

School districts
 Pike County School Corporation

Political districts
 State House District 63
 State Senate District 48

References
 
 United States Census Bureau 2009 TIGER/Line Shapefiles
 IndianaMap

External links
 Indiana Township Association
 United Township Association of Indiana
 City-Data.com page for Patoka Township

Townships in Pike County, Indiana
Jasper, Indiana micropolitan area
Townships in Indiana